Trio con Brio Copenhagen is a piano trio based in Copenhagen, Denmark. It was formed in 1999 and consists of the Danish pianist Jens Elvekjaer and the two South Korean sisters Soo-Jin Hong and Soo-Kyung Hong.

Soo-Jin Hong and Soo-Kyung Hong play an Andrea Guarneri violin and an Amati cello, respectively, and Jens Elvekjaer is the first Danish Steinway Artist.

Biography
The trio was founded by its three members in Vienna in 1999. Its name refers to the composer's instruction allegro con brio "lively with spirit". Sisters Soo-Jin and Soo-Kyung Hong were born in South Korea and had performed together since childhood. They met Elvekjaer while he was studying in Vienna. Soo-Kyung later married Elvekjaer. The trio had its breakthrough when it took the main award at the prestigious German ARD International Music Competition in 2002.

Subsequently Trio con Brio settled in Copenhagen and In 2003 it performed the complete Beethoven piano trio cycle in three concerts at Tivoli Concert Hall in Copenhagen to much critical acclaim. In 2005 Trio con Brio became Ensemble in Residence at Copenhagen's historic Round Tower. These concerts were broadcast on the European Broadcasting Union and the national Danish broadcaster DR.

Parallel to these engagements, Trio con Brio continued to win awards at competitions and festivals around the world, culminating with the highly prestigious Kalichstein-Laredo-Robinson International Trio Award in 2005. This gave them concert engagements in twenty major concert series across the USA as well as a record deal. In their review of trio's resulting debut CD, the American Record Guide wrote: “One of the greatest performances of chamber music I’ve ever encountered [...] What stands out from this ensemble is the range of tone and sound [...] They command an amazing range of timbres. Melodies sing with an aching sweetness, or seduce with wild eroticism, or haunt with impenetrable mystery" while Gramophone wrote that "it’s easy to see what so impressed the judges [...] [the] performances can compete with the best available [...] a superb, greatly gifted chamber group".

Since then the trio has performed at numerous music venues around the world. These include New York’s Carnegie Hall.

Concert activities
Trio con Brio Copenhagen tours worldwide, giving concerts in major concert halls and at festivals in Europe, North America and Asia. In Copenhagen the trio gives regular concerts at venues such as the Queen's Hall of the Black Diamond.

Trio con Brio Copenhagen is frequently featured as soloists in Beethoven’s Triple Concerto with orchestras such as the Danish National Symphony Orchestra, the Copenhagen Philharmonic, the Polish Chamber Philharmonic Orchestra, l’Orchestre Syrinx (France), and the Prime Philharmonic Orchestra (Korea).

Awards

 2nd Prize, Vienna Haydn Competition. Austria
 2002 Danish Radio Competition. Denmark
 2002 ARD International Music Competition
 2002 Premio Trio di Trieste. Italy
 2003 Premio Vittorio Gui, Italy
 2003 Trondheim Chamber Music Competition . Norway
 "Allianz-Preis" for Best Ensemble at the Festspiele Mecklenburg-Vorpommern. Germany
 2005 Kalichstein-Laredo-Robinson International Trio Award
 Minor planet 6623 Trioconbrio is named after the band.

Discography

Mendelssohn Piano Trios, Marquis Classics 2009

References

External links
 Official website

Chamber music groups
Piano trios
Danish musical groups
Danish classical musicians
South Korean classical musicians
Musical groups established in 1999
1999 establishments in Denmark